The 2003 Katsina State gubernatorial election occurred on 19 April 2003. PDP candidate Umaru Musa Yar'Adua won the election, defeating ANPP Nura Khalil and 5 other candidates.

Results
Umaru Musa Yar'Adua from the PDP won the election. 7 candidates contested in the election.

The total number of registered voters in the state was 2,567,245, total votes cast was 1,721,067, valid votes was 1,636,824 and rejected votes was 84,243.

Umaru Musa Yar'Adua, (PDP)- 892,340
Nura Khalil, ANPP- 742,582
Amani Mohammed Bashir B. Y., PRP- 492
Yakubu Sada Abubakar, NDP- 463
Shehu Isa Kaita, MDJ- 425
Aminu Abdulmumini, UNPP- 346
Mohammed Tajo Usman, NCP- 176

References 

Katsina State gubernatorial election
2003
Kats